The Rose of San Juan is a 1913 American silent-era short drama film starring Sydney Ayres, Charlotte Burton, and Louise Lester. Directed by Ayres for the American Film Manufacturing Company, The Rose of San Juan was distributed by Mutual Film.  Prints and/or fragments were found in the Dawson Film Find in 1978.

Plot 
The film's hero, played by Ayres, falls in love with a Mexican girl, much to the anger of a rival suitor.

Cast
Sydney Ayres   
Charlotte Burton   
Caroline Cooke 
Charles Cummings   
Jacques Jaccard   
Louise Lester   
Charles Morrison  
Jack Richardson   
Vivian Rich   
Harry Van Meter

Production 
The film was shot in and around the historic adobes in Santa Barbara, California, where the AFMC was based.

External links

References 

1913 films
Silent American drama films
American silent short films
American black-and-white films
1913 drama films
1913 short films
American Film Company films
Films directed by Sydney Ayres
1910s American films
1910s English-language films
English-language drama films
American drama short films